Sideroxylon reclinatum, the Florida bully, is a small tree in the family Sapotaceae. It occurs locally in the southeastern United States.

Subspecies
 Sideroxylon subsp. austrofloridense 
 Sideroxylon subsp. reclinatum
 Sideroxylon subsp. rufotomentosum

References

reclinatum
Trees of the United States